Tietz is a surname, and may refer to:

 Anthony Joseph Tietz (1947-), American Fermentation Scientist
 Anton Ferdinand Tietz (1742–1810), German composer
 Gerold Tietz (1941-2009), German author
 Hermann Tietz (1837-1907), merchant and founder of one of the first German department stores
 Hermann Tietz (rabbi) (1834-????), German rabbi.
 Leonhard Tietz (1849-1914), merchant and founder of one of the first German department stores
 Marion Tietz (born 1952), East German handball player and Olympian
 Oscar Tietz (1858-1923), German merchant and  businessman
 Phillip Tietz (born 1997), German footballer
 Viktor Tietz (1859–1937), Czech–German chess player, chess life organizer and local politician
 Jason Tietz (born 1987), American Designer and artist

Named after people with this surname 
 Kulturkaufhaus Tietz
 Tietz syndrome

Other uses 
 an old name of Tütz in Hinterpommern (now Tuczno in Poland)

Surnames
Surnames from given names